SS Gallia was a transatlantic ocean liner of the Compagnie de Navigation Sud-Atlantique built in 1913. Gallia was the Roman name for the province of Gaul.

In the First World War Gallia was converted into first an armed merchant cruiser and then a troop ship. In 1916 she was torpedoed and sunk by the German U-Boat SM U-35 in the Mediterranean Sea with great loss of life.

Building and peacetime service

The Société Nouvelle des Forges et Chantiers de la Méditerranée built Gallia at La Seyne-sur-Mer as one of a set of three liners for Compagnie de Navigation Sud-Atlantique's mail and passenger service between France and South America. The same shipyard also built her sister ship . Chantiers de l'Atlantique built , the other member of the trio.

She was equipped for wireless telegraphy, operated by the Compagnie générale radiotélégraphique (CGR).

Gallia sailed between Bordeaux and Rio de Janeiro in 10 days, and between Bordeaux and Buenos Aires in 13 days.

First World War
When the First World War broke out Gallia was converted into an armed merchant cruiser. Her primary armament was five  guns and her secondary armament was four 47 mm guns.

In 1915 Gallia was refitted as a troopship.

On 3 October 1916 Gallia left Toulon unescorted for Thessaloniki in Greece carrying 1,650 French soldiers, 350 Serbian soldiers and 350 crew and a cargo of artillery and ammunition. The next day the German submarine , commanded by Lothar von Arnauld de la Perière, torpedoed her southwest of Sardinia.

Ammunition aboard Gallia exploded and the ship sank in 15 minutes. Because of the rapid sinking, panic broke out on board resulting in lifeboats capsizing, and thousands of soldiers jumping overboard. The ship's wireless was disabled by the explosions, preventing the sending of a distress signal. The next day the  rescued 1,200 survivors.

The exact number of casualties needs to be ascertained but it was over 1000. A list of missing personnel was published on 31 October 1917 by the Tribunal Civil of Toulon. It gave the names of 44 sailors and 553 soldiers. Several individual soldiers known by their family members to have died are not on the list. The Serbian soldiers were also not included.

See also
List by death toll of ships sunk by submarines

References

Bibliography

External links

 – log of Gallias port arrivals and departures from May to September 1916, and account of sinking.
 – discussion forum

1913 ships
Auxiliary cruisers
Maritime incidents in 1916
Ocean liners
Passenger ships of France
Ships built in France
Ships of the Compagnie de Navigation Sud-Atlantique
Ships sunk by German submarines in World War I
Steamships of France
Troop ships of France
World War I naval ships of France
World War I shipwrecks in the Mediterranean Sea